Stigmella hybnerella also known as the greenish thorn pigmy is a moth of the family Nepticulidae. It is found in all of Europe, in North Africa, the Near East, and the eastern part of the Palearctic realm.
The larvae mine the leaves of trees and shrubs such as hawthorns and rowans.

Description
Males of the species have a black head and golden-green coloured forewing with a white fascia distad to which the wing has purple hues . Females have black heads too, but sometimes orange. Adults are on wing from April to May and again from July to August. There are two generations per year.

Ecology
The larvae feed on snowy mespilus (Amelanchier ovalis), Cotoneasters, Midland hawthorn (Crataegus laevigata), common hawthorn (Crataegus monogyna), small-flowered black hawthorn (Crataegus pentagyna), common whitebeam (Sorbus aria) and wild service tree (Sorbus torminalis). They mine the leaves of their host plant. The mine consists of a slender corridor, with a relatively broad, continuous, frass line, that always leaves a clear margin at either side. This corridor winds freely through the leaf. This initial corridor widens into a blotch that mostly lies along the leaf margin. Pupation takes place outside of the mine.

Etymology
Stigmella hybnerella was described by the German entomologist Jacob Hübner in 1796 from a type specimen found in Europe. The genus Stigmella – ″stigma″, refers to the conspicious (or occasionally metallic) small dot or a brand fascia on the forewing of many of the Stigmella species, or possibly the small size of the moths. The species name hybnerella refers to Jacob Hübner, who seems to have named the moth after himself; although Maitland Emmet suggests it was probably proposed by another entomologist.

References

External links
Swedish moths
Stigmella hybnerella images at  Consortium for the Barcode of Life

Nepticulidae
Leaf miners
Moths described in 1796
Moths of Africa
Moths of Asia
Moths of Europe
Taxa named by Jacob Hübner